The Kyrgyz Economic University (Кыргызский экономический университет), is a Kyrgyz public university located in Bishkek. Specializing in economics and international relations, it is one of the best universities in Kyrgyzstan and one of the best in Central Asia in economics. It was founded in 1953.

The university also bears the name of Musa Ryskulbekov, since October 30, 2010, in tribute to a famous Kyrgyz economist.

According to the Independent Accreditation and Rating Agency, the Kyrgyz University of Economics has occupied first place in the ranking of the best higher education establishments in Kyrgyzstan since 2019.

History 
The Kyrgyz Economic University has its origins in the Frounzé Soviet College of Commerce founded in 1953, which became the Bishkek Commercial College in 1991.

In 1995, Kamchybekov Tolobek Kadyralievich, former Vice-rector of the Kyrgyz National University, was appointed director of the Bishkek Commercial College. On December 27, 1997, the college officially received the status of a higher education institution and became the Bishkek State Institute of Economy and Business. In 2003, the institute was renamed and became the State University of Economics and Entrepreneurship in Bishkek. It was finally on October 30, 2010, that the university was renamed the Kyrgyz University of Economics.

Since 1953, it has developed a different models and systems of management of the university. Today, the university offers economic, management and service (tourism, technology, hotel and restaurants services) education of students in bachelor's, master's and post-graduate degree studies. Kyrgyz Economic University is the major and respected public university of economics in the Kyrgyz Republic. At present it comprises three institutes, three faculties with twenty departments and is one of the fastest-growing higher education institutions in the Kyrgyz Republic. Kyrgyz Economic University is recognized as one of the important higher education institution and scientific research centre in the Kyrgyz Republic.
Kyrgyz Economic University was one of the pioneers in    the    Kyrgyz    Republic    to    introduce    Bologna principles   of   education   based   on   European   Credit Transfer System (ECTS). The label of Bachelor's and master's degree is currently implementing at the master's degree is currently implementing at the university.

Departments 
The Kyrgyz University of Economics has 12 departments:

 Department of Economic Theory and World Economy
 Department of Finance and Financial Control
 Department of Accounting, Analysis and Audit
 Department of Tourism, Hospitality and Entrepreneurship
 Department of Applied Informatics
 Department of Product Sciences, Product Expertise and Catering
 Department of Mathematical Methods in Economics
 Department of State and Official Languages
 Department of Foreign Languages
 Department of Philosophy and Social Sciences
 Department of Economics, Management and Marketing
 Department of Banking and Insurance

Teaching and research

International activity
Participates in:
 Tempus Program – since 2003,
 Erasmus Mundus – since 2007,
 DAAD – since 2005.
 Membership of EURHODIP (international association supporting hospitality and tourism education and training) 
 Joint project (tourism) with College University Telemark, Norway 
 Double-program development with University of Applied Sciences, Austria 
and Kodolányi János University of Applied Sciences, Hungary 
 Academic mobility program with universities of CIS countries and Mongolia

Programs of study
KEU offers the following programs of study:
 Accounting
 Finance Management
 Banking 
 Economics and Management
 International Economics
 Marketing
 Tourism and Hotel Management
 Restaurant Business

Research 
The Kyrgyz Economic University brings together a large international research center which focuses on the economic issues of Kyrgyzstan and Central Asia, but also on economic theory in general, the application of mathematics and computer science to the economy, the interweaving of the economy in international relations as well as around finance issues. Several international teams lead projects within the university.

Student life 
Students from the Kyrgyz Economic University organize student activities around the Center for Youth Policy and Student Initiatives.

Maximum magazine is published monthly by an editorial committee made up of university students. The Centurion intellectual club aims to bring together students in order to develop analytical and logical thinking by broadening horizons. There is also a volunteer club, a creative ensemble and a national dance team.

The students are generally gathered in the 4 student brotherhoods of the university (Alpha, Beta, Gamma and Delta).

References

Educational institutions established in 1953
Educational institutions in Asia
1953 establishments in the Soviet Union